This is a list of villages in Bangladesh. A village is a clustered human settlement or community, larger than a hamlet but smaller than a town, with a population ranging from a few hundred to a few thousand. Some villages in Bangladesh may be covered in thickets of trees, including bamboo, coconut, date palm, betel nut, mango and jackfruit. Despite this, "only a small portion of the country’s land surface is covered with forests".

Villages in Bangladesh

A

 Abhaypara
 Aburkandi
 Achalchhila
 Adabaria, Barguna
 Adabaria, Patuakhali
 Adakhola
 Adarsha Andulia
 Adhara
 Adhuna
 Adoar
 Adra Ramchandrapur
 Agharbari
 Ahammadkati
 Ahammadpur
 Aihar
 Aingiri
 Ainpur
 Aithadi
 Aitpara
 Ajagara
 Ajalia
 Akania
 Akania Nasirpur
 Akharpara
 Akiara
 Algi Mukundi
 Aliara
 Alumura
 Amanullapur
 Ambagan
 American Camp
 Aminpur
 Amiyapur
 Amlaki
 Amragachhia Hogalpati
 Amua
 Amuakandi
 Amujan
 Anailkota
 Anakhanda
 Anandakati
 Andar Char
 Andirpar
 Andua
 Angaria, Jhalokati
 Angaria, Patuakhali
 Angura Muhammadpur
 Ankutia
 Anurag
 Anwarpur
 Aorabania
 Araibeki
 Araidron
 Arpangasia
 Aruli
 Asali Santoshpur
 Asatkuari
 Asharkota
 Ashrafpur
 Ashtodona
 Asikathi
 Āsoār
 Asokati
 Asrafpur
 Aswinpur
 At Hazar
 Atakara
 Atakati
 Atarkhali
 Athara Gachhia
 Atipara
 Atiswar
 Auliapur
 Ausia
 Ayla Patakata
 Ayma
 Aynatali

Top of page

B

 Babarkhana
 Bacha Shah Nagar
 Bachaia
 Bachhpar
 Badalpara
 Badanpur
 Badepurura
 Badiulla
 Badiyazzamapur
 Baduri
 Badurtala
 Baga, Bhola
 Baga, Patuakhali
 Bagdha
 Bagdia
 Baghadi
 Baghar
 Baghia
 Baghmara
 Baghopara
 Bagiser Par
 Bagua Anantapur
 Bagura
 Bahadurpur, Bangladesh
 Bahalgachhia
 Bahari
 Baharia
 Baharkati
 Baher Khalisaduli
 Baherakhola
 Bahir Char Kshudrakati
 Bahirghat
 Baiara
 Baichatali
 Baichhara
 Baiddyamari
 Baidyanathpur
 Bairagia
 Bajetula
 Bakai
 Bakal
 Bakhaia
 Bakharpara
 Bakharpur
 Bakila
 Bakra
 Baksi Char
 Balaibania
 Balaikati
 Balairkandi
 Balakhal
 Baldia
 Baliakandi
 Baliarpur
 Baliatali
 Balichatia
 Balsid
 Balur Char
 Baluthupa
 Baman Barara
 Bamanikati
 Bamankati
 Bamrail
 Banamalikati
 Bangila
 Baniacho
 Baniakandi
 Baniasuri
 Bankati
 Bansbaria
 Bansgari
 Bansgari
 Baorkhola
 Bapta
 Bara Ani
 Bara Baduria
 Bara Baliatali
 Bara Basail
 Bara Bighai
 Bara Char Khajurtala
 Bara Char Lamchhi Pata
 Bara Char Samaia
 Bara Chaulakati
 Bara Doani
 Bara Gaurichanna
 Bara Hamidpur
 Bara Hamidpur
 Bara Jalia
 Bara Kanthalia
 Bara Kasba
 Bara Machhua
 Bara Madhab Rayer Char
 Bara Manika
 Bara Nachnapara
 Bara Paika
 Bara Pata
 Bara Patar Char
 Bara Puiautha
 Bara Saula
 Baradal
 Baragharia
 Barahanuddin
 Barahazar
 Barahipur
 Baraidaha
 Barakotha
 Barapaika
 Bariali
 Baribathan
 Barpara, Bandarban
 Barta
 Barthi
 Basabari
 Basudeb Chap
 Basudebpara
 Basupatti
 Batajor
 Batamara
 Bathua
 Baulasar
 Bausia
 Bayelakhal
 Bazitkhan
 Bebaz
 Begungram
 Bejahar
 Bejra
 Belgachhi
 Beluhar
 Betagi Sinhakhali
 Betbunia, Khulna
 Betgarbha
 Betra
 Beukhir
 Bezgati
 Bhadeshwar
 Bhadun
 Bhandarikati
 Bhangar Mona
 Bharikati
 Bharpasa
 Bharsakati
 Bhaterchar
 Bhaudhar
 Bhazon Kara
 Bhikampur
 Bhimerpar
 Bhimruli
 Bhitabaria
 Bhojmahal
 Bhumsara
 Bhurghata
 Bhuta Lakshmipur
 Bhutardia
 Bhutua
 Biara
 Bibi Chini
 Bihangal
 Biharipur
 Bilgabbari
 Billabari
 Billagram
 Bisainkhan
 Bisarad
 Bisarikati Charkhanda
 Bisarkandi
 Boali Sakhipur
 Boalia
 Boalia, Gopalgonj
 Bonpara
 Borta Para
 Brahmandia
 Braja Mohan
 Budhar
 Budhrail
 Bukabania
 Burir Char

Top of page

C

 Chakman
 Chanchra
 Chand Trisira
 Chandi
 Chandkati
 Chandpasa Kismat
 Changaria
 Chaora
 Chapachupa
 Char Abdani
 Char Aicha
 Char Algi
 Char Amtali
 Char Annadaprasad
 Char Bahadurpur
 Char Balarampur
 Char Bara Lamchhi Dhali
 Char Bausia
 Char Bausiar Ghordaur
 Char Bhuai
 Char Bhuta
 Char Chandra Prasad
 Char Chithalia
 Char Dahali
 Char Decree
 Char Dhaleswar
 Char Doani Lathimara
 Char Dumurtala
 Char Durgapur
 Char Gachhua
 Char Gadhatali
 Char Haria
 Char Hesamaddi
 Char Hijla
 Char Hogalpatai
 Char Hogla
 Char Ilsa
 Char Jahapur
 Char Kalekhan
 Char Kapalbera
 Char Keutia
 Char Khagkata
 Char Khajuria
 Char Khanam
 Char Kolania
 Char Kusaria
 Char Lakshmipura
 Char Lata
 Char Madhab Rai
 Char Mahisha
 Char Malanga
 Char Manpura
 Char Memania
 Char Monai
 Char Nehalganj
 Char Padma
 Char Pakshya
 Char Pattania
 Char Payla
 Char Rangasri
 Char Sahebpur
 Char Sangar
 Char Santoshpur
 Char Satikhola
 Char Silinda
 Char Sonapur
 Char Sonarpur
 Char Udaypur
 Char Ulanghuni
 Charamaddi
 Charbaria Lamchari
 Charbaria
 Charigaon
 Charkhali
 Charkowna
 Charshahi
 Chata Araji
 Chatra
 Chaukati
 Chaulahar
 Chaulakati
 Chauliapatty
 Chengatia
 Chhagaldi
 Chhailabania
 Chhanbaria
 Chhankhola
 Chhaygram
 Chhopkhali
 Chhota Basail
 Chhota Char Khajurtala
 Chhota Chaulakati
 Chhota Dumuria
 Chhota Hamidpur
 Chhota Kandapasa
 Chhota Kasba
 Chhota Lakshmipur
 Chhota Patar Char
 Chhota Puiautha
 Chhota Saula
 Chila Chhonauta
 Chinatola Bazaar
 Chirakhola
 Chotogolla
 Chowara
 Chowbari
 Chunakhali
 Chunar Char
 Chunati
 Crowpara

Top of page

D

 Daihari
 Dakshin Pustigasa
 Dakshin Telikhali
 Dal Char
 Daokati
 Darbeser Kandi
 Dari Char Gazipur
 Dari Char Khajuria
 Dariabad
 Dasherjangal
 Daspatti
 Dattasar
 Datterabad
 Dauatala
 Daudkhali
 Daulatpur, Manikganj
 Deapara
 Deopara
 Dehergati
 Deotala
 Des Bhuai
 Deulbari Dobra
 Dhakirgaon
 Dhakurkati
 Dhalua
 Dhamsar
 Dhamura
 Dhangora
 Dhanisafa
 Dhankundi
 Dhannapur
 Dhaoa
 Dhopakati
 Dhopapara
 Dhul Khola
 Dhumchar
 Dhupkhali
 Dhuriail
 Diapara
 Diasur
 Diatali
 Dighia
 Dingar Hat
 Dohazari
 Donarkandi
 Dudhal
 Dulalpur
 Durgapur
 Durvazury
 Dwip Char
Top of page

E

 East Jorkhali
 East Pasuribania
 Egarosindur

Top of page

F

 Fultali
 Fardabad
 Fasiatala

Top of page

G

 Garaia
 Garangal Rajpasa
 Gariabania
 Gakulnagar
 Gazipur, Barguna
 Ghighara
 Ghorashal
 Ghorua
 Ghosher Tikikata
 Gilatala
 Gimadanga
 Goalbari
 Gojkhali
 Gokarna
 Golartek
 Golbunia
 Golman
 Gomostapur
 Gopalpur
 Gopinathkati
 Gopinathpur
 Gorfotu
 Gowpara
 Guatan
 Guli
 Gulisakhali
 Gupta Brindaban

Top of page

H

 Haidarabad
 Haldia
 Harbang
 Haribhanga
 Haridaspur
 Haridrabaria
 Hat Mokamia
 Haydor Pur
 Hemayetpur
 Himanandakati
 Hogalpati
 Hogla

Top of page

I

 Ikri
 Ishwaripur
 Islampur
 Itna

Top of page

J

 Jagair-At
 Jahedpur
 Jalabari
 Jaminpur
 Jammura
 Jamunia
 Jaykul
 Jethagram
 Jhigli
 Jilbania
 Jnanpara
 Jugirkanda
 Jurvarongpara

Top of page

K

 Kachikata
 Kadambari
 Kafurkati
 Kakchira
 Kalaran Chandipur
 Kalikabari
 Kalipur
 Kalmegha
 Kalyanpur
 Kamarkati
 Kanaipur
 Kanchabalia
 Kansa
 Kantha Chora
 Kanudaskati
 Karai Tala
 Karpara
 Karpurkati
 Karuna
 Kathaltali
 Katnarpara
 Kayempur
 Kawkhali
 Kazirabad
 Keorabunia
 Kesarta
 Kewabania
 Khaduly
 Khadimpur
 Khanjanpur
 Khilpara
 Kotkandi
 Krisnapur
 Kukua
 Kumar Barilya
 Kumrakhali

Top of page

L

 Lainkalangpara
 Langalbandh
 Latifpur
 Lebubania
 Lohagara, Chittagong

Top of page

M

 Machimpur
 Magura, Pirojpur
 Magurchara Punji
 Mahajanpara
 Malikanda
 Masaba
 Matibhanga
 Middle Courtgaon
 Mirerkhil, Bhujpur union
 Mirzaganj, Patuakhali
 Mirzapur, Ishwarganj, Mymensingh
 Mithakhali
 Muninag
 Munshinagla
 Musurikati

Top of page

N

 Nadmula
 Naikati
 Nalbania
 Naldanga
 Nali Chak
 Naltona
 Namazpur
 Naodhar
 Napitkhali
 Narerkati
 Narikelbaria
 Natun Bazzar
 Nazir Hat
 Niamati
 Nidhanpur
 Nij Bamna
 Nilati
 Nizamia Ghopkhali
 Nizbolail
 Noagaon, Sarail
 Noapara
 North Halta 
 Nowlamary
 Nazirpur

Top of page

O

 Oskhali

Top of page

P

 Paiyapathar
 Pakmahar
 Palash Kandy
 Panch Para
 Panchuria
 Patakata
 Pathorghata
 Payari
 Phalaibania
 Phuljhuri
 Pirgachha, Bogra
 Pomara
 Poshanda
 Pratapnagar
 Purquil
 Purush Pal
 Porabari

Top of page

R

 Rajapur
 Rajdharpur
 Rambadak
 Ramu, Cox's Bazar
 Ranamati
 Rangalia
 Randhunibari
 Ranhat
 Ranipur
 Ratonpur
 Rejupara
 Roangchari
 Ronipara
 Rudaghara
 Rudrapur
 Rulkippara
 Ruma Bazar

Top of page

S

 Sadarkati
 Sagornal
 Saildaha
 Sakarail
 Sakhagachhi
 Sakharia
 Samudaykati
 Sangumukh
 Sankardhabal
 Sankharikati
 Sapleja
 Sarankhola
 Sardarpara
 Satadaskati
 Shaharpara
 Shahebabad
 Shahbazpur, Brahmanbaria
 Shahjalal Uposhahar
 Singbahura
 Singhanagar
 Singpa
 Sit Mamudpur
 Sohagdal
 South Amragachhia
 South Gazipur
 South Halta
 South Kalikabari
 South Sarwakati
 Srikanthakati
 Srimantakati
 Sriramkati
 Sujaul
 Suktagar
 Sultanpur
 Sunampur
 Syedpur

Top of page

T

 Taltoli
 Tanibhanga
 Tarabania
 Tarpurchandi
 Tarundia
 Tatinakhali
 Telihar
 Telikhali
 Than Sinhapur
 Titurkandi
 Tolatoly
 Tona
 Tushkhali

Top of page

U

 Ujalhati
 Ujalpur
 Ulipukuri
 Umajuri
 Umarerbari
 Uttar Sonakhali

Top of page

V

 Ververy

Top of page

W

 West Chunakhali

Top of page

See also

 Index of Bangladesh-related articles
 List of cities and towns in Bangladesh
 Outline of Bangladesh
 Villages of Bangladesh

References

Villages
Bangladesh
 
Villages